Katerynivka is a popular name for populated places in Ukraine. There are at least 42 villages with this name in Ukraine. 

Katerynivka may refer to:
 Katerynivka, Luhansk Raion, Luhansk Oblast, an urban-type settlement in Luhansk Oblast, Ukraine
 Katerynivka, Donetsk Oblast, a village in Donetsk Oblast, Ukraine
 Katerynivka, Popasna Raion, a village in Luhansk Oblast, Ukraine
 Katerynivka, Ternopil Oblast, a village in Ternopil Oblast, Ukraine

See also
 Caterinovca, a village in Moldova